John Erickson, FRSE, FBA, FRSA (17 April 1929 – 10 February 2002) was a British historian and defence expert who wrote extensively on the Second World War. His two best-known books – The Road to Stalingrad and The Road to Berlin – dealt with the Soviet response to the German invasion of the Soviet Union, covering the period from 1941 to 1945. He was respected for his knowledge of the Soviet Union during the Cold War. His Russian language skills and knowledge gained him respect.

Education and career
John Erickson was born on 17 April 1929 in the town of South Shields (then part of County Durham), England. He was educated at South Shields High School for Boys and St John's College, Cambridge, where he graduated MA Hons.

He became a research fellow of St Antony's College, Oxford, from 1956 until 1958, during which he met his future wife Ljubica Petrovic, a young Yugoslavian attending Oxford to read English. At the culmination of their courtship, they sought the permission of the Yugoslav cultural attache before their wedding in 1957.

Professor Erickson then taught at the universities of St Andrews in 1958, Manchester in 1962 and then Indiana in 1964 before becoming a reader in higher defence studies at the University of Edinburgh in 1967. In 1969 he became Professor of Defence Studies, a position he held until 1988, where he founded and was the head of the Centre for Defence Studies. From 1988 to 1996 he was the director of the Centre for Defence Studies.

Erickson wrote of his research for his two-volume history of Stalin's war with Germany that he was surprised with the extent of personal archives (lichnye arkhivy) held by former Red Army soldiers of many ranks, and:   
 " .. that there is no substitute for having the late Marshal Koniev – spectacles perched on nose – read from his own personal notebook, detailing operational orders, his own personal instructions to select commanders and his tally of Soviet casualties. And while on the subject of casualties, Marshal Koniev made it plain that, though such figurers did exist, he was not prepared on his own authority to allow certain figures to be released for publication while a number of commanders were still alive. As for such figures as were published, I was assured by expert and thoroughly professional Soviet military historians that these were reliable, which is to say that they were the product of intensive and painstaking research . The comment on them or the implications of the figures were presumably a different matter. It was all the more useful, therefore, to have the opportunity to discuss these findings with Soviet military historians, on the basis of their work with formal and informal sources."

Edinburgh Conversations
The Edinburgh Conversations were a series of meetings that took place between 1983 and 1989 between prominent political & military leaders in Western countries and their Soviet counterparts. The purpose of the meetings were to allow face-to-face dialogue to take place in a neutral setting. The first Soviet delegation included the editor of Pravda and two army generals.

Origin
The UK formally suspended diplomatic contact with the Soviet Union after the 1979 invasion of Afghanistan. Erickson sought to maintain a forum of discussion between the West and the Soviet Union. The setting alternated between Edinburgh and Moscow. Although both sides approached the initial meeting with suspicion, the knowledge of Erickson and his insistence upon "academic rules" contributed to their ongoing success.

Impact
In recognition of Erickson's achievement, Sir Michael Eliot Howard declared that ‘Nobody deserves more credit for the ultimate dissolution of the misunderstandings that brought the Cold War to an end and enabled the peoples of Russia and their western neighbours to live in peace.’

Publications
The Soviet High Command 1918-1941: A Military-Political History 1918-1941, St Martin's Press (Macmillan), London, 1962
Panslavism, Routledge & Kegan Paul, for The Historical Association, London, 1964
The Military-Technical Revolution, Praeger, New York, 1966 (Revised and updated papers from a symposium held at the Institute for the Study of the USSR, Munich, Oct. 1964)
Soviet Military Power, Royal United Services Institute, London, 1976
Soviet Military Power and Performance, Palgrave Macmillan Press, London, 1979  
The Road to Stalingrad, Stalin's War with Germany, Volume 1, Harper & Row, Publishers, New York 1975 
The Road to Stalingrad, Stalin's War with Germany, Volume 1, Weidenfeld & Nicolson, London 1975, 1983 
The Road to Berlin. Stalin's War with Germany, Volume 2, Weidenfeld & Nicolson, London 1983
The Soviet Ground Forces: An Operational Assessment, Westview Printing, 1986
Deep Battle: The Brainchild of Marshal Tukhachevski, by Richard Simpkin in association with John Erickson, Brasseys's, 1987
The Russian Front, a four-part narrated televised series, Cromwell Films, 1998 (1. Barbarossa Hitler Turns East, 2. The Road to Stalingrad, 3. Stalingrad to Kursk and 4. The Battles for Berlin)
Barbarossa: The Axis and the Allies, Erickson, John and Dilks, David, eds, Edinburgh University Press, 1994 (contributors include Dmitri Volkogonov, Harry Hinsley, Klaus Reinhardt)
The Eastern Front in Photographs: From Barbarossa to Stalingrad and Berlin, Carlton Publishing, 2001

References

External links
  (under 'Erickson, John, 1929–' without '2002')
 

1929 births
2002 deaths
Academics of the University of Edinburgh
Alumni of St John's College, Cambridge
British military historians
Historians of World War II
20th-century British historians
Fellows of the British Academy
Fellows of the Royal Historical Society